Lillian McElroy (April 28, 1917 – November 12, 2009) was an American politician who served in the Iowa House of Representatives from 1971 to 1977.

She died on November 12, 2009, in Nebraska City, Nebraska at age 92.

References

1917 births
2009 deaths
Republican Party members of the Iowa House of Representatives
20th-century American politicians